Edward Herbert "Brickey" Farmer (1885 – 5 April 1969) was a rugby union player who represented Australia.

Farmer, a flanker, was born in Holborn and claimed 1 international rugby cap for Australia.

References

                   

Australian rugby union players
Australia international rugby union players
1885 births
1969 deaths
Rugby union flankers
Rugby union players from London